is an action role-playing video game series developed by FromSoftware. Titles in this series have been released for the PlayStation, PlayStation 2, PlayStation Portable, Microsoft Windows, and various mobile phone platforms.

King's Field was released as a launch title for the PlayStation in 1994. The game's fully 3D, first person perspective was considered groundbreaking among role-playing video games of the time; it would influence FromSoftware’s later work, most notably Demon’s Souls and the Dark Souls series, as well as Soulslike games. The next two King's Field titles followed in quick succession: King's Field II in 1995 and King's Field III in 1996. King's Field IV was released for the PlayStation 2 in 2001.

Games

PlayStation 
The first game in the series, King's Field, was released only in Japan. While it was not localized into English, a fan has written a full English translation patch.

In King's Field, the player takes the role of Jean Alfred Forrester. He is searching for his missing father, Hauser Forrester, who disappeared along with his soldiers while exploring a dead king's underground graveyard. Shorter than the others in the series, King's Field includes five floors. The main aspects of gameplay consist of first-person battles, puzzle solving, and exploration.

After the success of the first game, King's Field II was also released in North America and Europe, retitled simply King's Field without a numeral nor subtitle. In the sequel, the player takes the role of Granitiki prince Aleph (アレフ・ガルーシャ・レグナス) (alternatively named Alef/Alexander) who is shipwrecked on Melanat, an accursed island that has drawn the attention and forces of the new king of Verdite—and an old friend—Jean.

In King's Field III  (released in North America as King's Field II), the player takes the role of Verdite prince Lyle (ライル・ウォリシス・フォレスター) as he struggles to uncover the reasons behind his father Jean's sudden descent into madness and restore his kingdom. A large portion of the game takes place above ground, but the main aspects of gameplay remain unchanged: first-person battles, puzzle solving and exploration.

PlayStation 2 
King's Field IV (released as King's Field: The Ancient City  in North America) was the first game from the series released on the PlayStation 2 console. The entire game takes place within the Land of Disaster, where the forest folk once dwelled until an evil curse came upon the land. The player takes the role of Prince Devian of the Azalin Empire who has been given the task of returning the cause of the blight, the Idol of Sorrow, back to the cursed land. His journey follows the downfall of the Kingdom of Heladin and the exploits of Septiego the Sword Master who led an expedition of over 1000 men in a failed effort to return the cursed Idol.

PlayStation Portable 
King's Field: Additional I is the first game of the series released on the PlayStation Portable. It was only released in Japan and was never localized into English. The "Additional" series uses a step-by-step style of gameplay, rather than free-roaming.

King's Field: Additional II, the sequel, was also released only in Japan with no English localization. It featured the ability to import the player's character from Kings Field: Additional I, including all equipment and statistics.

Microsoft Windows 
Sword of Moonlight: King's Field Making Tool is a King's Field designing tool for the Microsoft Windows platform which was released in Japan. It lets the user construct free-standing King's Field games which may be played independently, without having Sword of Moonlight installed. It also contains a full remake of the first King’s Field game originally released on the PlayStation. A fan-made full English translation is available as an unofficial patch.

Mobile phones 
King's Field Mobile was released in Japan for mobile phones. It was followed by two sequels: King's Field Mobile 2, and King's Field EX.

Merchandise and other media 
To commemorate their 20th anniversary, From Software released the special collection package called the King's Field Dark Side Box in 2007, which contained a reissue of the four King's Field games which had previously been released on the PlayStation and PlayStation 2, as well as soundtracks for all six games, a map of Verdite, and other bonuses.

Reception 

Critical reception for the series in general was extremely polarized. Common criticisms include: slow-moving player character, low number of game characters (NPCs), difficult gameplay, and muddy colors.

As opposed to other combat based role-playing video games, King's Field focuses more on exploration and a dark brooding ambience. The slow character movement facilitates streaming data from the game disc which eliminates loading screens that were common among most PlayStation titles.

A spiritual successor to the series, Demon's Souls, was released in 2009. That game in turn served as a predecessor to the Dark Souls series.

References 

 
Video game franchises
Video game franchises introduced in 1994
Kadokawa Dwango franchises
FromSoftware games